Israeli–Japanese relations began on May 15, 1952, when Japan recognized Israel and an Israeli legation opened in Tokyo. In 1954, Japan's ambassador to Turkey assumed the additional role of minister to Israel. In 1955, a Japanese legation with a Minister Plenipotentiary opened in Tel Aviv. In 1963, relations were upgraded to Embassy level and have remained on that level since then.

Japan's trade relations with Arab League members and most Muslim-majority countries have taken a precedence over those with Israel. However, due to the declining price of oil in early 2015, as well as internal political shifting in Japan, the two nations are seeking increased research, economic and cultural ties, particularly in the area of tech start-ups and defense. Recently, ties between Israel and Japan have strengthened significantly, with many mutual investments between the two nations. Former prime minister of Japan Shinzo Abe visited Israel twice – once in 2015 and a second time in 2018.

History

1920s
In 1922, Norihiro Yasue and Koreshige Inuzuka, head of the Imperial Japanese Navy's Advisory Bureau on Jewish Affairs, returned from their military service in Siberia to provide aid to the White movement against the Red Army. They became particularly interested in Jewish affairs after having learned of The Protocols of the Elders of Zion. Over the course of the 1920s, they wrote many reports on the Jews, and traveled to Mandatory Palestine to research them and to speak with Zionist leaders Chaim Weizmann and David Ben-Gurion. Yasue even translated the Protocols into Japanese (variations of it have frequently made the bestseller lists in Japan). The pair managed to get the Foreign Ministry of Japan, or Gaimusho, interested in Judaism. Every Japanese embassy and consulate was requested to keep the Ministry informed of the actions and movements of Jewish communities in their respective countries.

Fugu Plan

The Fugu Plan was an idea first discussed in 1934, in the Empire of Japan, centered around the idea of settling thousands, if not tens of thousands, of Jewish refugees escaping Nazi-occupied Europe, in Manchuria and Japanese-occupied Shanghai. The Imperial government wanted to gain Jewish economic prowess while convincing the United States, specifically American Jewry, to grant their favor and invest in Japan. The Plan was first discussed in 1934, and solidified in 1938 at the Five Ministers' Conference, but the signing of the Tripartite Pact in 1940, along with a number of other events, prevented its full implementation.

The plan was originally the idea of a small group of Japanese government and military officials led by Captain Koreshige Inuzuka and Colonel Norihiro Yasue who came to be known as the "Jewish experts", along with industrialist Yoshisuke Aikawa and a number of officials in the Kwantung Army known as the "Manchurian Faction". The plan was named after the Japanese delicacy "fugu", a puffer-fish whose poison can kill if the dish is not prepared exactly correct. The plan was based on a naive acceptance of European antisemitic prejudices, as found in the Japanese acceptance of The Protocols of the Elders of Zion as fact. Hitler argued that the Jews were powerful and had to be killed. The Japanese decided instead to try to utilize Jewish “power” for themselves. Their misconception of Jewish power and wealth was partly due to their experience with Jacob Schiff, a Jewish-American banker who, thirty years earlier, loaned money to the Japanese government that allowed it to win the Russo-Japanese War.

The "Jewish experts" joined forces, to an extent, with the "Manchurian Faction", Japanese military officials who wished to push for Japanese expansion into Manchuria. The faction was headed by Colonel Seishirō Itagaki and Lieutenant-Colonel Kanji Ishiwara, who were having trouble attracting Japanese settlers or investment into Manchuria. In 1938, top government officials discussed the ideas and plans of the "Jewish experts" in the Five Ministers' Conference. The Plan never got off the ground. In 1939, the Jews of Shanghai requested that no more Jewish refugees be sent into Shanghai, as their community's ability to support them was being stretched thin.

During World War II
 

In 1939, the Soviet Union signed a non-aggression pact with Nazi Germany, making the transport of Jews from Europe to Japan far more difficult. The Japanese government signed the Tripartite Pact with Germany and Italy, completely eliminating the possibility of any official aid for the Plan from Tokyo.

However, Chiune Sugihara, the Japanese Consul in Kaunas, Lithuania, began to issue, against orders from Tokyo, transit visas to escaping Jews, allowing them to travel to Japan and stay there for a limited time, ostensibly stopping off on their way to their final destination, the Dutch colony of Curaçao, which required no entry visa. Thousands of Jews received transit visas from him, or through similar means. Some even copied, by hand, the visa that Sugihara had written. After the grueling process of requesting exit visas from the Soviet government, many Jews were allowed to cross Russia on the Trans-Siberian Railway, then took a boat from Vladivostok to Tsuruga, and eventually settled in Kobe, Japan.

Settler plans
Plans allowed for the settler populations to range in size from 18,000 up to 600,000 depending on how much funding and how many settlers were supplied by the world Jewish community. It was agreed, by all the planners, that Jewish settlers would be given complete freedom of religion, along with cultural and educational autonomy. While the Japanese were wary of giving the Jews too much freedom, they felt that some freedom would be necessary to maintain their favor, and their economic proficiencies. The officials asked to approve the plan insisted that, while the settlement was to appear autonomous, controls needed to be placed, behind the scenes, to keep Jews under close watch and under control. They feared that the Jews might take over mainstream Japanese government and economy, taking command of it the way they, according to The Protocols of the Elders of Zion, "had done in many other countries."

Impact
Several thousand Jews were rescued from almost certain death in Nazi-Occupied Europe by the policies surrounding Japan's temporary pro-Jewish attitude, and Chiune Sugihara was bestowed the honor of the Righteous Among the Nations by the Government of Israel in 1985. In addition, the Mir Yeshiva, one of the largest centers of rabbinical study today, and the only yeshiva to survive The Holocaust, survived as a result of these events.

Post-1950s relations

In 1993 both nations signed the "Convention between Japan and the State of Israel for the Avoidance of Double Taxation and the Prevention of Fiscal Evasion with Respect to Taxes on Income." In 2000, the two nations signed the "Agreement between the Government of Japan and the Government of the State of Israel for Air Services." There were 708 Japanese nationals in Israel as of October 1999 and 604 Israeli nationals in Japan as of December 1998.

The Japanese government appointed Yoshinori Katori, press secretary at the Foreign Ministry, as ambassador to Israel on August 1, 2006. Katori previously served as minister to South Korea and director-general of the Consular Affairs Bureau before assuming the current post in August 2005. In September 2008, Katori ended his post to Israel and was replaced by ambassador Haruhisa Takeuchi, who presented his credentials on December 1, 2008.

In July 2006, Japan announced a plan for peace called "Corridor for Peace and Prosperity", which would be based on common economic development and effort by Israelis and Palestinians, rather than on continuous contention over land. Shimon Peres gave this idea much attention during his participation in an international conference in New York in September 2006 which was organized by former U.S. President Bill Clinton.

In July 2008, the Japanese government reiterated its support for the plan in meetings with Israelis and Palestinians, and urged the sides to continue working towards completion. Japan also indicated specific support for an agro-industrial park to be built near Jericho, and said it hopes to begin construction by 2009.

Considering Israel's and Japan's shared democratic values, open trade policies, complementary business and industrial environments, and close alliance with the United States, relations between the two countries have long remained strikingly underdeveloped, until approximately 2014, when both governments moved to significantly upgrade diplomatic and business ties. This rapid warming of relations is evidenced by the two countries entering into a number of important political and economic agreements – from a series of high-level dialogues on national security and cybersecurity to their first bilateral investment agreement – transforming their once limited bilateral relationship into one more characteristic of allied partners, a process that has been described as "rising sun relations" in Foreign Affairs magazine.

Recently ties between Israel and Japan have strengthened significantly, with many mutual investments between the two nations. Japanese prime minister Shinzo Abe visited Israel twice – once in 2015 and a second time in 2018. In May 2014, Israeli Prime Minister Benjamin Netanyahu visited Japan.

In July 2021, the eleven Israeli victims of the terror attack at the Munich 1972 Olympics were remembered in silence during opening ceremony of the Tokyo 2020 Olympics, held in 2021 due to the global COVID-19 pandemic. This is the first-ever mourning at an opening ceremony of the Olympic Games in around a half century, and was thoroughly welcomed by relatives of the victims and Israeli Prime Minister Naftali Bennett.

Economy
Until the 1990s, Japan was the industrialized nation that acquiesced most strongly to the Arab demands to boycott Israel. As a result, economic relations have been limited for most of the State of Israel's history.

Israeli exports to Japan, consisting primarily of polished diamonds, chemical products, machinery, electrical equipment, and citrus fruit are worth $810 million. Japanese exports to Israel, consisting primarily of automobiles, machinery, electrical equipment, and chemical products, are worth $1.3 billion.

There has been growing trade between the two countries in terms of technology, as well as partnerships between startups and venture capitalists. According to the Japan External Trade Organization (JETRO), 35 Japanese companies had subsidiaries in Israel by 2015 and as many as 50 in November 2016.

In 2021, Data compiled by consulting firm Harel-Hertz shows a surge of $1.1 billion of Japanese investment in Israeli high-tech.

Academic relations 
Universities in both countries are making special efforts to conduct lively exchange of studies. In May 2012, a symposium to commemorate the sixtieth anniversary of the diplomatic relations was held at the Hebrew University of Jerusalem, to discuss issues of regional, bilateral, and cultural exchanges. The Israeli Association of Japanese studies was also launched on that occasion.

Visits

Quotes
 "Israel and Japan are situated at opposite ends of Asia, but this is a fact which binds them together rather than separates them. The vast continent of Asia is their connecting link, and the consciousness of their Asian destiny is their common thought." – Israeli Prime Minister David Ben-Gurion, July 1, 1952
 Both Israel and Japan are "ancient peoples who have risen from the ashes of the Second World War to build on the platform of our ancient cultures thriving, successful and advanced societies." – Israeli Foreign Minister Silvan Shalom, January 17, 2005

See also

 Antisemitism in Japan
 History of the Jews in Japan
 International recognition of Israel
 Japanese-Jewish common ancestry theory
 Makuya

References

Further reading
 Rabbi Marvin Tokayer, The Fugu Plan. New York: Weatherhill, Inc. (1979)
 John Katz, Israeli–Japanese Relations, 1948–1963 Tel Aviv: Saar (2007)
 Matthew Brummer and Eitan Oren, ''Israel and Japan's Rising Sun Relations''. Foreign Affairs (2017)

External links
 Japan-Israel Relations at the Ministry of Foreign Affairs of Japan website
 Security Incidents Set Tone for Japanese PM's Visit Ynetnews
 "Friendly Relations With Japan"
 "EVS Receives Award from Israel-Japan Chamber of Commerce"
 "Japanese Policy in the Middle East", Raquel Shaoul
 Badr Abdel-Aati, "The Influence of External Factors on Foreign Policy: A Case Study of Japanese Policies towards Israel 1973–2003"
 "ADL Leaders, in Tokyo, Praise Japan's Leadership in Global War Against Terrorism"
 "Japan's Koizumi mulling visits to Israel, Palestinian territories"
 "Japan and the Middle East: Signs of Change?"
 Japan-Israel Fellowship

 
Japan
Israel
History of the foreign relations of Japan